David Mayhew (born February 19, 1982) is an American professional stock car racing driver. He currently last competed part-time in the NASCAR K&N Pro Series West, driving the No. 17 Chevrolet SS for Golden Gate Racing.

Racing career

A five-time winner in the International Kart Federation National Championships, Mayhew competed in the U.S. F2000 National Championship before switching to stock cars; in 2006, he won the NASCAR AutoZone Elite Division, Southwest Series Rookie of the Year award. Mayhew joined Richard Childress Racing as a development driver in 2007, competing in the K&N Pro Series West for Golden Gate Racing through the 2008 season; he was released from the team at the end of the year, and replaced by Blake Koch.

Driving for Steve McGowen in 2009, Mayhew scored his first win in the series at Iowa Speedway, finishing the season sixth in points with two wins; despite only scoring one win in 2010, he finished second in points. In 2010 Mayhew also made his debut in the NASCAR Camping World Truck Series, driving Kevin Harvick Incorporated equipment operated by McGowen; he ran a limited schedule in the series in that year and in 2011, winning a pole at Iowa Speedway in the latter year. Two of Mayhew's 2011 races were driven for KHI itself; in both races he finished third, his best career finish in the series. He also competed in one Nationwide Series race for KHI in 2011, finishing 10th in his first start in the series. Also in 2011, Mayhew qualified the No. 66 HP Racing Toyota for the Sprint Cup Series' Toyota/Save Mart 350 in place of regular driver Michael McDowell, who drove the car in the race.

Returning to the K&N Pro Series West in 2012 after running a limited schedule in the series in 2011, Mayhew led all 50 laps of the opening race of the 2012 season at Phoenix International Raceway. He scored top 10 finishes in each of the season's first seven races; in June, he was signed by Phil Parsons Racing to race the No. 98 Sprint Cup car in the 2012 Toyota/Save Mart 350 at Infineon Raceway; Mayhew finished 40th in the event.

Mayhew was also asked by Kevin Harvick to stand by as a substitute driver during the summer of 2012, on call to replace Harvick in the No. 29 Chevrolet if needed as Harvick and wife DeLana expected their first child. In the fall of the year he competed for Brad Keselowski Racing in four races in the Camping World Truck Series.

In 2014, Mayhew substituted for J. J. Yeley in the No. 44 Xxxtreme Motorsport Chevy in Sprint Cup Series qualifying at Sonoma.

Motorsports career results

NASCAR
(key) (Bold – Pole position awarded by qualifying time. Italics – Pole position earned by points standings or practice time. * – Most laps led.)

Sprint Cup Series

Nationwide Series

Camping World Truck Series

K&N Pro Series East

K&N Pro Series West

Autozone Elite Division, Southwest Series

* Season still in progress
1 Ineligible for series points

References

External links

 

Racing drivers from California
Living people
1982 births
NASCAR drivers
International Kart Federation drivers
People from Atascadero, California
Sportspeople from Southern California